Sven Bernth Thomsen (7 September 1884 – 14 November 1968) was a Danish sailor who competed in the 1912 Summer Olympics. He was part of the Danish boat Nurdug II, which won the silver medal in the 6 metre class.

References

External links
 
 
 

1884 births
1968 deaths
Danish male sailors (sport)
Olympic sailors of Denmark
Olympic silver medalists for Denmark
Olympic medalists in sailing
Sailors at the 1912 Summer Olympics – 6 Metre
Medalists at the 1912 Summer Olympics